Walter Matthau was an American actor. He starred with Jack Lemmon on some films.

Filmography

Film 

Source: Internet Movie Database and Turner Classic Movies

Television

Source: Internet Movie Database and Turner Classic Movies

Theatre

'''Source: Internet Broadway Database

External links

References 

Male actor filmographies
American filmographies